The Zhenru Chan Temple is a Chan Buddhist temple located on the southwestern hillside of Mount Yunju in Yongxiu County, Jiangxi, China. Zhenru Chan Temple is the cradle of Caodong school in Chinese Buddhism. The temple has been burned down and rebuilt several times due to wars and fires. The present version was completed in the 1950s.

History

Tang dynasty
The Zhenru Temple was built between 806 and 810 during the mid-Tang dynasty (618–907) by monk Daorong, where he taught Chan Buddhism with his disciples Quanqing and Quanhui for almost 70 years. In the year 883 during the reign of Emperor Xizong, the local military governor Zhong Chuan invited master Daoying to the temple to preach Buddhism. The emperor bestowed a plaque inscribed by with Chinese characters of "Longchang Chan Temple".

Yuan dynasty
In the late Yuan dynasty (1127–1368), a fire consumed the whole temple.

Ming dynasty
In 1592, in the 20th year of Wanli period in the Ming dynasty (1368–1644), Hongduan, the abbot of Wanfo Temple in Beijing, went to Mount Yuju to rebuild the temple. After the empress dowager heard the news, she gave a bronze statue of Rocana and a set of Tripitaka to help the reconstruction project. In 1602, the Wanli Emperor inscribed some plaques and couplets to the temple.

Republic of China
In 1937, after the Marco Polo Bridge Incident broke out, the Imperial Japanese Army began to invade China and the Zhenru Chan Temple was demolished by artillery. Only the bronze statue of Rocana survived.

People's Republic of China

After the establishment of the People's Republic of China, Chan master Xuyun, then Honorary Chairman of the Chinese Buddhist Association, started to reconstruct the temple. The reconstruction took six years, and lasted from 1953 to 1959. In 1957, the Zhenru Temple was designated as a provincial level key cultural heritage by the Jiangxi Provincial Government.

In 1966, Mao Zedong launched the Cultural Revolution, almost all volumes of scriptures, historical documents, statues of Buddha, and other works of art were either removed, damaged or destroyed under the attack of the Red Guards. And the government forced monks to return to secular life.

After the 3rd Plenary Session of the 11th Central Committee of the Chinese Communist Party, according to the national policy of free religious belief, Zhenru Chan Temple was officially reopened to the public in 1982. Then the temple reactivated its religious activities. The halls were restored and renovated by the local government. In September 1982 the Stupa of Hsu Yun was added to the temple. In 1983, the temple was classified as a National Key Buddhist Temple in Han Chinese Area by the State Council of China. At the end of 1986, the shanmen, abbot's room, storeroom and other halls were gradually completed.

In September 1990, in order to commemorate the reconstruction of Hsu Yun, the temple build a memorial hall named after him.

In 2006, Zhenru Chan Temple was listed among the six group of "Major National Historical and Cultural Sites in Jiangxi" by the State Council of China.

On April 2, 2015, former Chairman of the Standing Committee of the National People's Congress Wu Bangguo and his wife Zhang Ruizhen visited the temple. On September 9, King of Cambodia Norodom Sihamoni visited  and presented a statue of Sakyamuni to the temple.

On December 21, 2017, former Venerable Master of the Buddhist Association of China Yicheng died in the temple.

Architecture
They are organized in a neat formation.

Hall of Four Heavenly Kings
The Four Heavenly Kings are enshrined in the Hall of Four Heavenly Kings. They are the eastern Dhṛtarāṣṭra, the southern Virūḍhaka, the western Virūpākṣa, and the northern Vaiśravaṇa.

Mahavira Hall
The Mahavira Hall is the second hall and main hall in the temple. In the middle is the statue of Sakyamuni, statues of Amitabha and Bhaisajyaguru stand on the left and right sides of Sakyamuni's statue. At the back of his statue are the statues of Samantabhadra, Guanyin and Manjushri. The statues of Eighteen Arhats stand on both sides of the hall. It was built by Hsu Yun in 1955.

Memorial Hall of Hsu Yun
The Memorial Hall of Hsu Yun was built in September 1990. In front of the hall, a wooden plaque with the Chinese characters "Memorial Hall of Hsu Yun" is hung under the eaves written by the then Venerable Master of the Buddhist Association of China Zhao Puchu.

References

External links
 

Buddhist temples in Jiangxi
Buildings and structures in Jiujiang
Tourist attractions in Jiujiang
20th-century establishments in China
20th-century Buddhist temples
9th-century establishments in China
9th-century Buddhist temples
Major National Historical and Cultural Sites in Jiangxi